The Emerson Apartments, located in northeast Portland, Oregon, are listed on the National Register of Historic Places.

See also
 National Register of Historic Places listings in Northeast Portland, Oregon

References

1912 establishments in Oregon
Buildings designated early commercial in the National Register of Historic Places
Residential buildings completed in 1912
Apartment buildings on the National Register of Historic Places in Portland, Oregon
Northeast Portland, Oregon
Humboldt, Portland, Oregon
Portland Historic Landmarks